The 1999–2000 season was the 54th season in FK Partizan's existence. This article shows player statistics and matches that the club played during the 1999–2000 season.

Competitions

First League of FR Yugoslavia

UEFA Champions League

First qualifying round

Second qualifying round

Third qualifying round

UEFA Cup

First round

See also
 List of FK Partizan seasons

References

External links
 Official website
 Partizanopedia 1999-2000  (in Serbian)

FK Partizan seasons
Partizan